Ashleigh Barty was the defending champion but did not participate this year as she had qualified for the WTA Finals.

Aryna Sabalenka won the title, defeating Kiki Bertens in the final, 6–4, 6–2.

Players

Alternates

Draw

Finals

Azalea group

Camellia group

Orchid group

Rose group

References

External links
 Singles Draw
 Official Website 

WTA Elite Trophy
WTA Elite Trophy
2019 in Chinese tennis